The Muganja hills are a range in the Tanganyika District of Katanga Province in the Democratic Republic of the Congo, to the south of Kalemie.

The Muganja massif contains the Lukuga coalfield near Kalemie.

The Muganja hills lie to the north of the Marungu massif, which as of 2008 had almost all been converted to farmland or pasture.
However, the Muganja hills in 2008 were surrounded by a large area of Miombo woodland and riverine forest.
A survey that year found evidence of chimpanzee, baboon, blue monkey and bushpig in the forest to the north of the hills. 
About 59 chimpanzees were estimated to be present.

References
Citations

Sources

Mountain ranges of the Democratic Republic of the Congo
Tanganyika Province